Evelio Hernández may refer to:

 Evelio Hernández (baseball) (1931-2015), Cuban baseball player
 Evelio Hernández (footballer) (born 1984), Venezuelan footballer